Like all municipalities of Puerto Rico, Las Marías is subdivided into administrative units called barrios, which are roughly comparable to minor civil divisions, (and means wards or boroughs or neighborhoods in English). The barrios and subbarrios, in turn, are further subdivided into smaller local populated place areas/units called sectores (sectors in English). The types of sectores may vary, from normally sector to urbanización to reparto to barriada to residencial, among others. Some sectors appear in two barrios.

List of sectors by barrio

Alto Sano
Sector Alto Sano Interior

Anones
Parcelas Andiarenas
Parcelas La Mota
Sector Casey
Sector Cementerio
Sector El Tornillo
Sector Los Vélez
Sector Pepe Trabal

Bucarabones

Sector Guilloty
Sector La Constancia
Sector La Josefa
Sector Magueyes
Sector Plan Bonito

Buena Vista
Parcelas Juan González
Sector El Guasio
Sector El Recreo
Sector Frontera
Sector Los Adventistas
Sector Los Jorge
Sector La Perrera
Sector Los Verdes
Sector Palo Prieto
Sector Relámpago

Cerrote
Sector Bryan
Sector Casanova
Sector Guaba
Sector Justiniano
Sector Laguna
Sector Miraflores

Chamorro
Parcelas Enseñat
Parcelas Esmoris
Sector La Constancia
Sector Pedro Acevedo
Sector Vargas

Espino
There are no sectors in Espino barrio.

Furnias
Centro Envejecientes Guajanas
Comunidad Guillermo Martínez
Sector Cosme
Sector La Juanita
Sector La Trapa
Sector Naranjales
Sector Santa Rosa

Las Marías barrio-pueblo
Calle Palmer
Calle San Benito
Urbanización Lavergne
Urbanización Serrano

Maravilla Este
Avenida Adrián Acevedo
Calle Barbosa y Bernard
Calle Rafael Quiles
Comunidad Muñoz Torruellas
Parcelas Acevedo
Sector Agustín Torres
Sector El Guasio
Sector La Calzada
Sector La Gallera
Sector La Vega del Combate
Sector Méndez

Maravilla Norte
Calle Augusto Cruz
Calle Matías Brughman
Parcelas Lavergne
Parcelas Santaliz
Reparto Santaliz
Sector El Llano
Sector Río Arenas
Urbanización Estancias Santaliz

Maravilla Sur
Residencial Jardines
Río Arenas Apartments
Sector La Candelaria
Sector La Milagrosa
Sector La Trapa
Sector Mayagüecillo
Urbanización Colinas de María
Urbanización El Bosque
Urbanización El Coquí
Urbanización Inmaculado Corazón de María

Naranjales
Comunidad La Isabel
Parcelas Alto Nieva
Parcelas Plato Indio
Sector Alto Manzano
Sector Alto Nieva
Sector Consumo
Sector Herrería
Sector La Cochera
Sector La Josefa
Sector La Loma de los Vientos
Sector La Trapa
Sector Merle
Sector Retiro
Tramo Carretera 106

Palma Escrita
Sector Abanico
Sector Alto Manzano
Sector Mayagüecillo
Sector Palo Prieto
Sector Zapata

Purísima Concepción
Camino Durán
Camino El Porvenir
Camino Las Vélez
Carretera La Pura
Hacienda Bauzá
Sector Francisco Ramos
Sector La Teresa
Sector Los Millonarios
Sector Luisa Mercado
Sector Miguel Acevedo

Río Cañas
Parcelas El Triunfo
Parcelas La Trapa
Parcelas Plato Indio
Sector Los Martínez
Sector Merle

See also

 List of communities in Puerto Rico

References

Las Marías
Las Marías